Masuccio Primo (or Masuccio I) (1230–1306) was an Italian architect and sculptor of the 13th century, and was active in Naples. He was the godfather of the son of Pietro degli Stefani, known as Masuccio Segondo (1291–1387).

References

Architects from Naples
13th-century Italian architects
13th-century Italian sculptors
Italian male sculptors
14th-century Italian sculptors
1230 births
1306 deaths